Scream and Scream Again is a 1970 British science fiction conspiracy thriller film starring Vincent Price, Christopher Lee, Alfred Marks, Michael Gothard, and Peter Cushing. It is based on the novel The Disorientated Man (1967) attributed to 'Peter Saxon', a house pseudonym used by various authors in the 1960s and 1970s.

It marks the second teaming, after The Oblong Box, of actors Price and Lee with director Gordon Hessler. Price and Lee only share a brief scene in the film's climax. Cushing, in his brief scene, shares no screen time with either Price or Lee.

Although the film's title, and association with stars Price, Lee and Cushing, might suggest a violent horror film, the violence in the film is mostly understated and/or off-screen, while the plot owes more to films like Invasion of the Body Snatchers or 1970's era 'conspiracy thrillers' like The Parallax View.

Overlooked during its initial release, the film has since become a minor cult classic, with the Overlook Film Guide acknowledging it as: "one of the best science-fiction films made in Britain."

Plot 
The movie's structure is fragmented, as it alternates between three plot threads.

A man jogging through urban London grabs his heart and collapses. He wakes up in a hospital bed. The nurse tending him gives him water and leaves. He pulls down the bed covers to discover that his lower right leg has been amputated. He screams.  Later scenes repeat the same action as his other limbs are amputated.

Elsewhere, intelligence operative Konratz (Marshall Jones) returns to his home country, an unidentified Eastern European totalitarian state. After being debriefed by Captain Schweitz (Peter Sallis), Konratz steps around the table and places a hand on Schweitz’s shoulder, paralysing and then killing him.  Konratz is later reprimanded by his superior Major Benedek (Peter Cushing) for his torturing an escapee, Erika (Yutte Stensgaard). Konratz kills Major Benedek in the same way.

In London, Metropolitan Police Detective Superintendent Bellaver (Alfred Marks) investigates the rape and murder of a young woman, Eileen Stevens. Bellaver goes with young forensic pathologist Dr. David Sorel (Christopher Matthews) to the clinic of her employer Dr. Browning (Vincent Price) but he provides no useful information. A young woman, Sylvia (Judy Huxtable), is picked up at the Busted Pot Disco by the sinister Keith (Michael Gothard). She is killed by Keith and her body is later found drained of blood.

The two young women have apparently been raped and murdered by the same individual. Bellaver sends out several young policewomen to try to entrap the killer. WPC Helen Bradford (Judy Bloom), wearing a wire and electronic tracer, goes to the same club where she lets herself get picked up and driven away by Keith.  The police follow and arrive just after Keith has attacked her and appears to be drinking blood from her wrist.  With apparent superhuman strength, Keith fights off the arresting police and drives off. A long chase ensues by car and on foot through suburban London, during which Keith tears off his hand whilst handcuffed to the bumper of a police car in an attempt to escape. The pursuit ends at an estate where Keith throws himself into a vat of acid in an outbuilding.  The building turns out to belong to Dr. Browning, who explains that he uses the acid to destroy possible pathogens in his biological experiments. Bellaver is ordered to stop his investigations but Sorel decides to continue on his own.  Accompanied by WPC Bradford, he goes to Browning's laboratory. Bradford and their car disappear.  Later, Bradford wakes up restrained in the same hospital bed with the same nurse attending her as the dismembered jogger.

The narrative strands begin to come together when a senior UK Government officer, Fremont (Christopher Lee), meets Konratz at London's Trafalgar Square, and agrees to turn over all the evidence in exchange for a captured pilot.  Soon after, Konratz goes to police headquarters to remove all the evidence, and kills Bellaver.

Back at the laboratory, Sorel discovers Browning is about to dismember Bradford, as part of a plot to replace humans with composite beings. As they struggle, Browning reveals himself to be one of the composite superhumans. Konratz appears and is angry that Browning's actions have interfered with his part of the plot. When Browning expresses misgivings, he and Konratz struggle, allowing the others to escape.  Konratz is pushed into a vat of acid in the laboratory room. As Sorel and Bradford get outside, Fremont appears and tells them to wait for him. He goes back in and, in talking with Browning, reveals himself as a composite. He then subdues Browning, and pushed him into the acid. Fremont leaves with Sorel and WPC Bradford. When Sorel asks if it is all over, Fremont tells him it is only just beginning.

Cast 

 Vincent Price as Dr. Browning
 Christopher Lee as Fremont
 Peter Cushing as Benedek
 Judy Huxtable (billed as “guest star”) as Sylvia, 1st young woman at disco
 Alfred Marks as Detective Superintendent Bellaver
 Michael Gothard as Keith
 Anthony Newlands as Ludwig
 Peter Sallis as Schweitz
 David Lodge as Detective Inspector Strickland (end-title credit only)
 Uta Levka as Jane, nurse
 Christopher Matthews as Dr. David Sorel
 Judy Bloom (billed as Judi Bloom) as WPC Helen Bradford
 Clifford Earl as Detective Sergeant Jimmy Joyce
 Kenneth Benda as Professor Kingsmill
 Marshall Jones as Konratz
 Amen Corner as themselves
 Yutte Stensgaard as Erika, escaping woman
 Julian Holloway as Detective Constable Griffin (opening-title credit only)
 Nigel Lambert as Ken Sparten
 Kay Adrian as Nurse (uncredited)
 Edgar D. Davies as Rogers (uncredited)
 Rosalind Elliot as Valerie, 2nd young woman at disco (uncredited)
 Leslie Ewin as Tramp (uncredited)
 Lee Hudson as Matron (uncredited)
 Gertan Klauber as Border Guard (uncredited)
 Olga Linden as Eileen Stevens (uncredited)
 Stephen Preston as Fryer (uncredited)
 Joe Wadham as Wadham, Police Driver (uncredited)
 Lincoln Webb as Wrestler (uncredited)

Production
The movie is based on Peter Saxon's science fiction novel The Disorientated Man. For the most part, the movie follows the novel quite closely. In the novel, the antagonists turned out to be aliens. According to an interview with Christopher Lee, the characters were indeed going to be revealed as aliens in the movie's climax but all connections to that fact were cut out of the movie before it was released, leaving the enigmatic villains' backgrounds unexplained.

Rights to the novel were bought by Milton Subotsky of Amicus Productions who got financing from Louis Heyward head of European operations for AIP. There was a script by Subotsky but it was regarded as unplayable. Gordon Hessler says he got Chris Wicking to rewrite it

That was really a pulp book, a throwaway book that you read on a train. There was nothing in it, just empty pieces of action. But it was Chris who gave it a whole new level by using it as a political process of what might happen in the future. That is what made the picture, he's the one that came up with all those ideas, yet he still managed to keep the nuances of the sort of pulp fiction novel.

The eponymous theme song for the film was by Amen Corner, who appeared in the film singing it. This was one of their last appearances before Andy Fairweather Low departed for a solo career after a brief career with the band Fair Weather. This marked the first time that horror-movie icons Peter Cushing, Vincent Price and Christopher Lee appeared in the same feature-film but they do not share screen space. Cushing does not appear with either Lee or Price - only appearing in a cameo. Lee and Price share a brief scene towards the film's climax.

The film was made in the span of a month, starting on 5 May 1969 at Shepperton, having location work done at Trafalgar Square and Chertsey, Surrey. Though the film has a release date of 1970, the copyright lists 1969. In the final scene, Christopher Lee's Bentley has a tax disc with an expiry date of December 1969 thus strongly consistent with a production of 1969.

An episode of The X-Files, "Kill Switch", depicts Agent Fox Mulder in a virtual reality experience during which, like this film's victim, nurses periodically amputate his limbs while he sleeps.

Reception
Reviews from critics were mixed. Howard Thompson of The New York Times wrote that the film "tools along intriguingly for a while with some genuine possibilities before taking a nosedive" when it "ends up in still another mad scientist's lair." Variety wrote that the script "has almost as many holes as the assorted victims of the action. However, such criticism is completely irrelevant to the film's gripping momentum of horror." Roger Ebert gave the film two stars out of four, calling it "ridiculous" yet "impossible to dislike because they ask only that you share their sense of the absurd. The fascinating thing about this one is that it makes absolutely no sense at all until maybe the last 10 minutes. None." Gene Siskel of the Chicago Tribune gave the film one star, calling it "a violent and sick film ... that begs to be included in our annual worst twenty list." Kevin Thomas of the Los Angeles Times called the film "a superb piece of contemporary horror, a science fiction tale possessed of a credibility more terrifying than any of the Gothic witchery of 'Rosemary's Baby' ... It's one of those movies where you have no idea what's going on until the end, but once there, there's no letdown."

On Rotten Tomatoes the film has an approval rating of 64% based on 14 reviews, with an average rating of 5.45 out of 10.

References

External links
 

1970 films
1970 horror films
1970s English-language films
1970s science fiction films
1970s crime thriller films
British horror films
British science fiction films
British crime films
Films directed by Gordon Hessler
Films based on science fiction novels
1970s British films
Science fiction crime films